The Dwarves is a fantasy tactical role-playing video game developed by King Art Games. It features music composed by Benny Oschmann. In the game, players must find their way through various maze-like, medieval environments while battling a variety of monsters using a wide array of weapons. It is based on the novel The Dwarves, by Markus Heitz.

A beta version of the game was released on June 3, 2016.

There was a campaign on Kickstarter that raised $310,091 for the development of the game through 2015 and 2016. The Dwarves will be published by EuroVideo Medien and made available on GOG.com.

Reception

Reception to the game has been mixed, it has a score of 68% of Metacritic. The Sixth Axis awarded it a score of 5 out of 10, saying "those who will enjoy this game the most are fans of the books, but it’s a largely forgettable game for everyone else."
 IGN awarded it a score of 6.2 out of 10, saying that the game has a "good foundation, but unfortunately it's not strong enough to make up for the deficiencies of its gameplay."

References

  7^ The Dwarves (PS4) Product Details (https://oyprice.com/specification/the-dwarves-ps4)

King Art Games games
Linux games
THQ Nordic games
PlayStation 4 games
Role-playing video games
Xbox One games
PlayStation 4 Pro enhanced games

2016 video games
Classic Mac OS games
Windows games
Dwarves in popular culture